Broad Oak is a hamlet in Cumbria, England. It is located along the A595 road,  by road south of Egremont.

See also
List of places in Cumbria

References

Hamlets in Cumbria
Borough of Copeland